Lacey Mae Schwimmer (born June 28, 1988) is an American ballroom dancer and singer. She is best known as a fourth place finalist of the third season of So You Think You Can Dance. She is the daughter of noted dancer Buddy Schwimmer, as well as the cousin of Heidi Groskreutz, who placed fourth on the second season of So You Think You Can Dance and younger sister of Benji Schwimmer, the winner of the show's second season. She participated in the seventh season of Dancing with the Stars as a professional dancer paired with Lance Bass of 'N Sync, in the eighth season of the show paired with Jackass star Steve-O and in the ninth season paired with actor and Iron Chef America host Mark Dacascos. Schwimmer returned to Dancing with the Stars for its eleventh season and she was partnered with Disney Channel star Kyle Massey and in the 12th season, paired with radio host Mike Catherwood. In the thirteenth season, she was paired with transgender activist Chaz Bono. Schwimmer did not return for season 14 of Dancing With The Stars'.

Schwimmer competes in West Coast Swing and International Latin dance styles. She made an appearance in Jon Chu and Adam Sevani's "Biggest Online Dance Battle" against M&M Cru and was credited as a member of America's Best Dance Crew with Hok, another So You Think You Can Dance competitor. She's made television appearances on The Ellen DeGeneres Show, Good Morning America, and Jimmy Kimmel Live!. In 2008 she danced alongside Adam Sandler at the MTV Movie Awards 2008. She then appeared in the video of the song Rainbow, by Elisa with singer songwriter Vinnie Ferra.

She is a part of the iHollywood Dance faculty teaching master classes in the United States and Norway. Schwimmer also has her own line of tube socks as well as a dance wear line designed by Sugar and Bruno Dancewear collection.<ref>David Benaym. yessss"Lacey Schwimmer Styles Her Own Line" , "Movmnt Magazine, May 5, 2008</ref>

Schwimmer's debut single, "Love Soundz", was released June 21, 2011.

Early life
Lacey Schwimmer grew up in Redlands, California. Her parents are Laurie Kauffman and notable West Coast Swing dancer Buddy Schwimmer. She is the younger sister of Benji Schwimmer, winner of the second season of So You Think You Can Dance. 

Schwimmer has been training and dancing competitively since a young age.  At age seven, she and partner Brian Cordoba danced in the 1995 U.S. Open Swing Dance Championships.  At age ten, she and partner Blace Thompson placed 1st in the Young America Division at the 1998 U.S. Open Swing Dance Championships. Schwimmer went on to have annual top rankings at the U.S. Open Swing Dance Championships and has won numerous U.S. titles.

Early career
In January 2003, Schwimmer was paired with Jared Murillo, and the two began competing at a junior level. They were upgraded to the youth level in August 2003 and participated in dozens of competitions. They received the U.S. title in the Young Adult Division of the U.S. Open Swing Dance Championships.  They were also awarded the US National Youth Latin Championship in 2006. Schwimmer also appeared in Christina Aguilera's "Candyman" music video as a jitterbugger.

Schwimmer and Murillo have a cameo appearance in The Suite Life of Zack & Cody in the episode "Loosely Ballroom". She is in the background of the scene during which a ballroom competition takes place.

So You Think You Can Dance
Schwimmer entered the preliminary auditions for So You Think You Can Dance{'}s third season partnered by her brother, Benji Schwimmer, following his win the previous season.

After her selection to the top 20 finalists, Schwimmer was paired with contemporary/hip hop dancer Kameron Bink. The two danced together for five weeks successfully, with judges praising their chemistry and the ease with which they danced together; they were the only couple never in danger of elimination. As per the show's competitive structure at the time, couples were assigned new partners each week after week five; Schwimmer subsequently partnered with Danny Tidwell, Neil Haskell and Pasha Kovalev before being named to the season's Top 4 Finalist.

Historically, Lacey Schwimmer is among a group of ten dancers to have advanced through their respective seasons to the finales without finishing a single episode in jeopardy of elimination (others include Donyelle Jones, Katee Shean, Jakob Karr, Ashleigh Di Lello, Evan Kasprzak, Kent Boyd, Marko Germar, and champions of seasons 2, 4, and 8 respectively, Benji Schwimmer, Joshua Allen, and Melanie Moore).

Schwimmer joined her fellow season 3 contestants in the show's 2007 dance tour, which began in Albany, New York.

Lacey assisted her brother Benji in choreographing a West Coast Swing routine for Katee Shean and Joshua Allen during the show's fourth season.

Note: Results highlighted in red indicate that contestants placed in the bottom dancers or couples, but may not have necessarily been eliminated.

Later career

Dancing with the Stars
On the morning of August 25, 2008, on Good Morning America, Schwimmer was announced as the first "So You Think You Can Dance" alum to be a professional dancer on season seven of Dancing with the Stars and was partnered with Lance Bass. TV Guide reported that Schwimmer had endometriosis but was still able to continue on the show as her condition did not require surgery. She returned for seasons 8, 9, 11, 12 and 13. During that time, she and professional dancers Chelsie Hightower and Dmitry Chaplin were the only former participants from So You Think You Can Dance to perform as regulars on Dancing with the Stars. However, other SYTYCD alumni such as Anya Garnis, Iveta Lukosiute, Ashleigh Di Lello, Ryan DiLello and Pasha Kovalev have often done special performances performed during the results show.

On November 25, 2008, Schwimmer and her celebrity partner, Lance Bass, finished in third place. Lacey was on the last DWTS tour with her partner Lance Bass. The tour ended on February 8, 2009. Lacey returned for season eight of DWTS, and she was partnered with reality television star Steve-O. On August 24, 2009, it was announced on Good Morning America that Schwimmer would be partnering with Mark Dacascos for season nine. Schwimmer was not paired with a celebrity partner in season ten, but was present in a few results show dances.

In season 11, Schwimmer was partnered with Disney Channel star Kyle Massey. They made it to the finale and were the runners-up to Jennifer Grey and Derek Hough. For season 12, Lacey was partnered with radio personality Mike Catherwood. They were eliminated first on March 29, 2011. For season 13, Schwimmer was partnered with Chaz Bono. They were eliminated on October 25, 2011.

With Lance Bass
Average:24.5

Score was awarded by stand in judge Michael Flatley.

With Steve-O
Average:15.8

With Mark Dacascos
Average:22.1

Score was awarded by stand in judge Baz Luhrmann.

With Kyle Massey
Average:24.9

With Mike Catherwood
Average:15.0

With Chaz Bono
Average:18.8

Music career

Schwimmer was featured as a singer on the 2010 single "Red Cup (I Fly Solo)" by Cash Cash. In June 2011 she released her official single titled "Love Soundz" produced by The Monsters and The Strangerz. The song hit the airwaves on "On Air with Ryan Seacrest" on June 17, 2011 and was available on iTunes on June 21.

In 2012, Schwimmer was featured as a singer on the It Boys! single "Burning Up".

Awards
 2011 – 7th Place: Dancing With The Stars Season 13; Partner: Chaz Bono
 2011 – 11th Place: Dancing With The Stars Season 12; Partner: Mike Catherwood
 2010 – 2nd Place: Dancing With The Stars Season 11; Partner: Kyle Massey
 2009 – 6th Place: Dancing With The Stars Season 9; Partner: Mark Dacascos
 2009 – 8th Place: Dancing With The Stars Season 8; Partner: Steve-O
 2008 – 3rd Place: Dancing With The Stars Season 7; Partner: Lance Bass
 2007 – 1st Place: World Swing Dance Championships, Classic Division; Partner: Benji Schwimmer
 2007 – 4th Place: Season 3 of So You Think You Can Dance
 2006 – 1st Place: U.S. National Youth Latin Championships; Partner:  Jared Murillo
 2005 – 3rd Place: U.S. Open Swing Dance Championships; Young Adult Division (14–17 years); Partner:  Jared Murillo
 2004 – 1st Place: U.S. Open Swing Dance Championships; Young Adult Division (14–17 years); Partner:  Jared Murillo
 2003 – 2nd Place: U.S. Open Swing Dance Championships; Young Adult Division (14–17 years); Partner:  Jared Murillo
 2002 – 1st Place: U.S. Open Swing Dance Championships; Young Adult Division (14–17 years); Partner:  Jamie Bayard
 2001 – 2nd Place: U.S. Open Swing Dance Championships; Young Adult Division (14–17 years); Partner:  Jamie Bayard
 2000 – 1st Place: U.S. Open Swing Dance Championships; Young America Division (6–14 years); Partner:  Jamie Bayard
 1998 – 1st Place: U.S. Open Swing Dance Championships; Young America Division (6–12 years); Partner:  Blace Thompson

References

External links

So You Think You Can Dance (American TV series) contestants
1988 births
American female dancers
Dancers from California
American ballroom dancers
American Latter Day Saints
Living people
People from Redlands, California
21st-century American dancers
21st-century American women